Hassan Gouled Aptidon (October 15, 1915 – November 21, 2006) was the first President of Djibouti from 1977 to 1999.

Biography
He was born in the small village of Gerisa in the Lughaya district in Somaliland. He was born into the politically powerful Mamassan subclan of the Issa clan. He played an important role in Djibouti's struggle for independence from France. Hassan Gouled began his career in the 1930s as a nurse. He was stationed in Dikhil in 1932. He was then an entrepreneur. In 1946, he founded with Mahamoud Harbi Farah the Somali and Dankali Youth Club. They were elected together in 1951 to the Representative Council of the colony, then separated. Hassan Gouled is elected French senator, against Mahmoud Harbi. He remained so from 1952 to 1957. Hassan Gouled campaigned against Mahamoud Harbi Farah of the Union Republicaine party, who sought to join the territory with neighboring Somalia. By the time of the 23 November 1958 elections, Mahamoud Harbi's party had disintegrated and with the majority of the Afar vote, his faction won election. Mahamoud Harbi subsequently fled Djibouti, and later died in a plane crash.

Hassan Gouled served as Vice-President of the Government Council from 1958 to April 1959. Hassan Gouled also served in the French National Assembly 1959-1962 and the French Senate 1952–1958. He was defeated in parliamentary elections in 1962 by Moussa Ahmed Idriss of the Party of Popular Movement (PMP). In the 1960s, he led the Democratic Union Issa. It is a signatory to the agreement of Arta in September 1963. He was then education minister in a government led by Ali Aref Bourhan from 1963 to 1967. He was briefly jailed in July 1967, along with other officials of the PMP (which he had joined in 1965). He was elected to the Territorial Assembly in November 1968 and later became Minister of the Interior. Later he served as the first Prime Minister of Djibouti between May 1977 and July 1977.

Towards independence
In 1974, Hassan Gouled called a vote with the support of François Mitterrand. He became president of the African People's League for Independence (LPAI) created in February 1975 by the merger of the African People's Union (UPA) and the League for the Future and Order. The General Secretary was Ahmed Dini.

He became President of the Governing Council on 18 May 1977 and was elected President of the future Republic of Djibouti on 28 May by the Chamber of Deputies. It remained so until 1999. After the attack on the "Zinc Palm" in December 1977, it banned the main opposition party, the MPL, and established a one-party system.

Presidency
In 1981, Hassan Gouled turned the country into a one party state by declaring that his party, the People's Rally for Progress (Rassemblement populaire pour le progrès, RPP), was the sole legal one. As the RPP candidate, he was elected without opposition for a six-year term as President on 12 June 1981, receiving 84.58% of the vote. After the start of the Djiboutian Civil War in 1991, he allowed for a constitutional referendum on multiparty politics in September 1992, with four parties being permitted. In the parliamentary elections held in December 1992, only two parties competed, and the RPP won all 65 seats in the National Assembly. Gouled was reelected for a fourth term in May 1993 with 60.7% of the vote.

In the 1990s, the Djibouti economy deteriorated dramatically, with net external assets falling by 40 per cent. The World Bank issued "a correspondingly gloomy and highly critical" assessment, mentioning such social problems as the excessive consumption of the addictive and debilitating drug qat by Djibouti's citizens. During this period, Hassan Gouled's nephew Ismaïl Omar Guelleh not only maneuvered to be his successor, but increasingly came to handle affairs for the elderly Hassan Gouled.

On 4 February 1999, Gouled Aptidon announced that he would retire at the time of the next election, and an extraordinary congress of the RPP, the party chose Guelleh as its presidential candidate. Guelleh won the presidential election held in April 1999 and succeeded his uncle on 8 May 1999. Gouled Aptidon died at his home on 21 November 2006, aged 90.

Gouled's first wife, former First Lady Aicha Bogoreh, a proponent of women's rights and various charities, died in 2001. He married his second wife after Bogoreh's death.

Honours

Foreign honours
 :
 Honorary Recipient of the Order of the Crown of the Realm (1998)

References

External links

 page on the French National Assembly website 
 page on the French Senate website

1915 births
2006 deaths
People from Awdal
Union for the New Republic politicians
People's Rally for Progress politicians
Presidents of Djibouti
Prime Ministers of Djibouti
French Senators of the Fourth Republic
Senators of French East Africa
Deputies of the 1st National Assembly of the French Fifth Republic
Djiboutian independence activists
Muslim socialists
Deaths in Djibouti